The 2011 Connecticut Huskies men's soccer team represented the University of Connecticut during the 2011 NCAA Division I men's soccer season. It was the 73rd season the program sponsored a men's varsity soccer program.

The team reached the final of the 2011 Big East Men's Soccer Tournament and the quarterfinals of the 2011 NCAA Division I Men's Soccer Championship, their furthest in the NCAA Tournament since 2007.

Competitions 

Home team is listed on the right, and the away team is listed on the left.

Exhibitions

Regular season

Big East standings

Results summary

Results by round

Game reports

Big East Tournament

NCAA Tournament

Statistics

Appearances and goals

Goalkeeper stats

{| border="1" cellpadding="4" cellspacing="0" style="margin: 1em 1em 1em 1em 0; background: #f9f9f9; border: 1px #aaa solid; border-collapse: collapse; font-size: 95%; text-align: center;"
|-
| rowspan="2" style="width:1%; text-align:center;"|No.
| rowspan="2" style="width:1%; text-align:center;"|Nat.
| rowspan="2" style="width:30%; text-align:center;"|Player
| colspan="3" style="text-align:center;"|Total
| colspan="3" style="text-align:center;"|Regular season
| colspan="3" style="text-align:center;"|Big East Tournament
| colspan="3" style="text-align:center;"|NCAA Tournament
|-
|MIN
|GA
|GAA
|MIN
|GA
|GAA
|MIN
|GA
|GAA
|MIN
|GA
|GAA
|-
| style="text-align: right;" |0
|
| style="text-align: left;" |Jacob Wagmeister
|0
|0
|0.00
|0
|0
|0
|8
|0
|0.00
|0
|0
|0
|-
| style="text-align: right;" |1
|
| style="text-align: left;" |Lionel Brown
|0
|0
|0.00
|0
|0
|0
|0
|0
|0.00
|0
|0
|0
|-
| style="text-align: right;" |00
|
| style="text-align: left;" |Greg O'Brien
|0
|0
|0.00
|0
|0
|0
|0
|0
|0.00
|0
|0
|0
|-
| style="text-align: right;" |18
|
| style="text-align: left;" |Andre Blake
|2336
|10
|0.39
|1770
|8
|0.44
|276
|1
|0.25
|290
|2
|0.67
|-
| style="text-align: right;" |24
|
| style="text-align: left;" |Stefan Berkeley
|0
|0
|0.00
|0
|0
|0.00
|0
|0
|0.00
|0
|0
|0.00
|-
|colspan="3"|TOTALS
|2344
|10
|0.39
|1770
|8
|0.44
|276
|1
|0.25
|290
|2
|0.67
|-

Transfers and recruits

See also 

 Connecticut Huskies
 Connecticut Huskies men's soccer
 2011 in American soccer
 2011 NCAA Division I men's soccer season

References 

Connecticut Huskies, Men
Connecticut Huskies
Connecticut Huskies
UConn Huskies men's soccer seasons